My Best Pals is a 1989 French comedy film directed by Jean-Marie Poiré.

Cast 
 Gérard Lanvin - Richard Chappoteaux
 Christian Clavier - Jean-Michel Thuillier
 Jean-Pierre Bacri - Eric Guidolini (Guido)
 Philippe Khorsand - Antoine Jobert
 Louise Portal - Bernadette Legranbois
 Jean-Pierre Darroussin - Daniel Pécoud (Dany)
 Marie-Anne Chazel - Anne
 Élisabeth Margoni - Monique

References

External links 

1989 comedy films
1989 films
French comedy films
Films directed by Jean-Marie Poiré
1980s French films